Andrea Air was a short-lived domestic airline in Peru. For a period in 1991, it flew between Lima, Arequipa and Cuzco with a fleet of two leased Fokker F28.

Fleet
Andrea Air operated a fleet of two Swedish registered Fokker F-28-1000 aircraft, SE-DGA (MSN11067) and SE-DGC (MSN11069). Both were leased in from Linjeflyg and went back to SAS after being repossessed half a year later. SE-DGB (MSN11068) was also leased at one point but the transaction was canceled before the aircraft entered service.

References

External links

Defunct airlines of Peru
Airlines established in 1991
Airlines disestablished in 1991
1991 establishments in Peru